Juan Alberto Rosas (born 28 November 1984) is a Mexican professional boxer and the former  IBF Super Flyweight champion. Juan Alberto fights out of Navojoa, Sonora, Mexico.

Professional career

IBF Super Flyweight Championship
On July 31, 2010 Rosas fought Simphiwe Nongqayi for the IBF Super Flyweight championship. Juan Alberto landed a body shot that forced Nongqayi to go down in the sixth, the South African would not continue.

In December 2010, he lost the IBF junior bantamweight champion to Cristian Mijares.

See also
List of Mexican boxing world champions
List of IBF world champions
List of super flyweight boxing champions

References

External links

Boxers from Nayarit
Sportspeople from Tepic, Nayarit
International Boxing Federation champions
World boxing champions
World super-flyweight boxing champions
Super-flyweight boxers
1984 births
Living people
Mexican male boxers